Sogdiyona Sport Majmuasi or Sogdiyona Stadium is a Sporting Complex, stadium in Jizzakh, Uzbekistan.  It is currently used mostly for football matches and is the home stadium of Sogdiyona Jizzakh. The stadium holds 11,650 spectators.

History
The stadium wit initial name Markaziy Stadium Jizzakh, in English: Central Stadium Jizzakh, was built in 1970. The stadium original capacity was 9,000 spectators. Over 40 years stadium became outdated. The first big renovation was held in 1997.

Reconstruction
In 2012 stadium was closed and underwent massive reconstruction. The construction works were finished and stadium holds 11,650 spectators. The stadium's name have been changed to Sogdiyona Sport Majmuasi. On 26 June 2015 Sogdiana Stadium was officiala opened with first official League match Sogdiana- Kokand 1912.

References

Football venues in Uzbekistan